Djokoiskandarus is a genus of snake in the family Homalopsidae that contains the sole species Djokoiskandarus annulata. It is commonly known as the banded water snake.

It is found in New Guinea.

References 

Colubrids
Monotypic snake genera
Reptiles described in 1926
Snakes of New Guinea